Høie is a Norwegian surname. Notable people with the surname include:

Bent Høie (born 1971), Norwegian politician
Gudrun Høie (born 1970), Norwegian sport wrestler
Kenneth Høie (born 1979), Norwegian footballer
Thomas Høie (1883–1948), Norwegian rower

Norwegian-language surnames